Georgia State Route 56 Spur may refer to:

 Georgia State Route 56 Spur (Burke County), spur route of State Route 56 in Burke County, Georgia
 Georgia State Route 56 Spur (Richmond County), former spur route of State Route 56 in Richmond County, Georgia

056 Spur